Cefsumide is an antibiotic of the cephalosporin group.

References

Cephalosporin antibiotics